Michael McGowan (born April 14, 1966) is a Canadian filmmaker who wrote and directed the feature films Saint Ralph, One Week, Still Mine, and Score: A Hockey Musical.

Early life 
McGowan was born in Toronto, Ontario, but graduated from the University of North Carolina with a BA in English.

Career 
Returning to Toronto he became a journalist, writing for publications such as Quill & Quire, Toronto Life and The Globe and Mail.

He then joined the TV industry, helping create the stop-motion children's TV show Henry's World, and then wrote and directed Saint Ralph in 2004, for which he won the Outstanding Achievement in Direction award from the Directors Guild of Canada and the Writers Guild of Canada award for Best Feature Film.

His film Score: A Hockey Musical was chosen to open the 35th Toronto International Film Festival in 2010.

Filmography
My Dog Vincent (1998)
Saint Ralph (2004)
Left Coast (2008, TV)
One Week (2008)
Vacation with Derek (2010, TV)
Score: A Hockey Musical (2010)
Still Mine (2012)
All My Puny Sorrows (2021)

Television
The Unprofessionals (2001) – unknown episodes
Between (2015, TV)

References

External links

Biography at tribute.ca

1966 births
20th-century Canadian screenwriters
20th-century Canadian male writers
21st-century Canadian screenwriters
21st-century Canadian male writers
Canadian children's writers
Film producers from Ontario
Canadian male screenwriters
Film directors from Toronto
Living people
Writers from Toronto